Wax Wings may refer to:

Icarus, Greek mythological figure who is said to have flown on wings made from feathers and wax
Wax Wings, 2013 album by American singer-songwriter Joshua Radin